Faison Cemetery is a historic cemetery located at Faison, Duplin County, North Carolina. The cemetery includes approximately 320 marked graves with the oldest dating to 1788.  The cemetery began as the Faison family burial ground and officially became the community cemetery for the white population in 1892.

It was added to the National Register of Historic Places in 2006.

US Congressman John M. Faison (1862–1915) is buried there.

References

External links
 

Cemeteries on the National Register of Historic Places in North Carolina
1788 establishments in North Carolina
Buildings and structures in Duplin County, North Carolina
National Register of Historic Places in Duplin County, North Carolina